"Hold Her in Your Hand" is a country ballad recorded by Maurice Gibb; it was his second and last single after "Railroad" in 1970. Samantha Gibb, the daughter of Maurice, recorded an acoustic version that was independently released on CD in 2013.

Recording
It was originally recorded by the Bee Gees and was written by Barry Gibb and Maurice Gibb in the sessions of Living Eyes in 1981, but was not released at that time. Maurice re-recorded the song for the film A Breed Apart. Gibb played numerous instruments on this track, including piano, guitar and bass. However, the musician who played harmonica and drums was not credited.

The country ballad-style would have made it ideal for Kenny Rogers (as the Gibbs wrote songs for him in 1983) The instrumental mix Maurice made for the B side has a little of his backing vocal in it.

Release
It was released as a single in September 1984 also appearing on the movie's soundtrack release. The music video was also included on the film. The B-side was an instrumental version of the song. He recorded this song in 1983, during the same time that he re-recorded "On Time", originally released by the Bee Gees in 1972 as the B-side of "My World".   The single was released in the Audiotrax Records in the United Kingdom and RCA Records in Australia but failed to chart in either the US or the UK.

"Hold Her in Your Hand" was included on the disc three of Mythology.

References

1984 songs
1984 singles
Maurice Gibb songs
Songs written by Barry Gibb
Songs written by Maurice Gibb
Song recordings produced by Maurice Gibb
RCA Records singles
Country ballads
Pop ballads